Louis Hubert Farabeuf (1841 – 1910), French surgeon who is said to have introduced hygiene in French medical schools. His statue dominates the central court of the National School of Medicine in Paris whose main amphitheater is also named after him. Farabeuf wrote some short surgical booklets (précis)<ref>L.H. Farabeuf, Precis de manuel operatoire in Google books]</ref> and designed several medical instruments (such as the Farabeuf elevator) that are still in use today. 

His name is associated with Farabeuf's triangle of the neck, a triangle formed by the internal jugular vein, common facial vein and the hypoglossal nerve, as well as Farabeuf retractors and Farabeuf forceps.
 
Farabeuf as a Fictional Character
His passionate writings and descriptions of amputation surgery attracted the attention of writers and scholars.

 Mexican writer, Salvador Elizondo, wrote a cryptic book:  Farabeuf o la Crónica de un instante. It is not a biography.

References

Notes
Farabeuf, Louis Hubert, Precis de manuel operatoire, Masson, Paris (1889)
José, Alán, Farabeuf y la estética del mal'', ESN (2003)[http://www.edicionessinnombre.com/blog/colecciones_libro.php?id=192_0_6_0_C

 Retractor (medical)
https://medical-dictionary.thefreedictionary.com/Farabeuf+forceps

External links
 

1841 births
1910 deaths
French surgeons